William Molteno Bisset (11 September 1867 – 23 February 1958) was a South African international rugby union player.

Early life and ancestry
Bisset was born in Kenilworth, Cape Town, the second son of Wynberg Mayor James Bisset and the grandson of Cape Town Mayor Hercules Jarvis. He attended Diocesan College and went on to become a solicitor.

Rugby career
He represented Western Province in the inaugural Currie Cup. He made his only two appearances for South Africa during Great Britain's 1891 tour. He was selected, as a forward, to play in the 1st and 3rd matches of the three Test series, both of which South Africa lost.

Test history

Professional career
Bisset was an attorney by profession. He was President of the Law Society (1919–20, 1924–25) and the South African Association in later life. He also came to be a director of companies in later life and he was a founding partner of the law firm Bisset Boehmke McBlain.

Personal
Bisset married Henrietta Katherine Tait and the couple had six children – four daughters (Islay Kathleen, Gwendolyn, Helen and Betty) and two sons (William Murray and Eldred). In 1902 he bought the house St James Manor in St James, Cape Town and lived there until 1912. He then settled with his family at Aboyne House in Kenilworth, Cape Town and died in 1958 at the age of 90.

See also
List of South Africa national rugby union players – Springbok no. 8

References

South African rugby union players
South Africa international rugby union players
1867 births
1958 deaths
Rugby union players from Cape Town
Alumni of Diocesan College, Cape Town
Rugby union forwards
Western Province (rugby union) players
South African people of Scottish descent
South African people of English descent